Thomas Forbes Mackie (30 March 1918 – 2 February 1989) was a Scottish professional footballer who played as a left back.

Career
Born in Burntisland, Mackie began his career at St Johnstone, before playing in the English Football League for New Brighton and Chester.

He also played non-league football for Runcorn.

References

1918 births
1989 deaths
Scottish footballers
St Johnstone F.C. players
New Brighton A.F.C. players
Chester City F.C. players
Runcorn F.C. Halton players
English Football League players
Association football fullbacks